The 2023 FIL European Luge Championships were held from 14 to 15 January 2023 in Sigulda, Latvia.

Schedule
Five events were held.

All times are local (UTC+2).

Medal summary

Medal table

Medalists

References

FIL European Luge Championships
 
European Championships
Luge
International luge competitions hosted by Latvia
Sport in Sigulda
FIL